Lázně Kynžvart is a spa town in Cheb District, Karlovy Vary Region, Czech Republic. It has about 1,400 inhabitants. It is known for the Kynžvart Castle.

Lázně Kynžvart is famous for its sanatorium, which is designed for children with nonspecific respiratory disorders.

Administrative parts
The hamlet of Lazy is an administrative part of Lázně Kynžvart.

Geography
There are several minor watercourses and several ponds in the area. The largest ponds are Pastevní and Dvouhrázový.

The southwestern part of the municipal territory lies in the Upper Palatine Forest Foothills, the northeastern part lies in the Slavkov Forest. Almost the entire territory belongs to the Slavkov Forest Protected Landscape Area.

History
The first written mention of Lázně Kynžvart is from 972 as Castelum settlement, when it was donated by Otto I, Holy Roman Emperor to bishop Wolfgang of Regensburg. Building of the castle finished in 1287. The castle soon lost its significance, was occupied by a bunch of thieves and in 1348 was burned to the ground by order of the King Charles IV. In 1398 the castle was built once again.

In 1370, after various forms of the town's name were used, the name Königswart was established. The Czech name has been used since 1918.

The Jewish Königswarter family originate in the town.

By World War II, majority of the population were Germans. After they were expelled, the area was resettled by Czechs.

Spa
The first mention of springs is from 1454. The spa was founded by the Metternich family, which owned the town's castle.

In 1822, Count Richard Metternich built a spa and six springs around the area. The area shortly became more popular after the spa was built. In 1872, a railway was built, which helped the growth of the spa and the town.

After 1950, during the whooping cough epidemic, children were treated in the spa. Since then, only children were treated in the spa. In 2013, treatment was again extended to adult patients.

Demographics

Notable people
Klemens von Metternich (1773–1859), Austrian diplomat and nobleman; owned the castle and stayed there

Twin towns – sister cities

Lázně Kynžvart is twinned with:
 Bad Bocklet, Germany

References

External links

Populated places in Cheb District
Cities and towns in the Czech Republic
Spa towns in the Czech Republic